Oakley Landing is an unincorporated community in Richmond County, in the U.S. state of Virginia. It is located eight miles south of Farnham at the southern tip of Hales Point, close to Tarpley Point, on the Rappahannock river.

References

Unincorporated communities in Virginia
Unincorporated communities in Richmond County, Virginia